José García Castro (10 July 1933 - 10 May 2003), also known as Pepillo, was a Spanish professional footballer. He played for Sevilla, Real Madrid, Mallorca, River Plate, and Málaga, as well as the Spanish B national team, between 1953 and 1966. He was sometimes nicknamed Pepillo II, to not confuse himself with former Sevilla player José Díaz Payán, who was also nicknamed Pepillo.

Playing career 
Pepilo II started his career as a striker in Sevilla's academy, making his debut in 1954 for the club. He scored 42 goals in 102 games for the club, before joining Real Madrid in 1959. He spent 4 years at Real Madrid, between 1959 and 1962. During the 1959-60 season, he scored 5 in a 11-2 win against Elche CF. In 1961, he went on loan to Argentine team River Plate, where he scored 7 goals in 18 games. He left Real Madrid to join Mallorca in 1962, where he scored 11 goals in his only season at the club. In 1965, he would join Malaga in 1965, where he scored 7 goals in 66 games, before retiring in 1966.

Managerial career 

He joined UD Melilla as their manager in 1983, lasting only 1 season.

Honours 

As Player:

Sevilla

La Liga: 1956–57 (Runner-Up)
Copa del Generalísimo: 1955 (Runner-Up)
Ramón de Carranza Trophy: 1955, 1956, 1957
Teresa Herrera Trophy: 1954

Real Madrid

European Cup: 1959-60
La Liga: 1961-62
Copa del Rey: 1961-62
Intercontinental Cup: 1960

References

External links

1933 births
2003 deaths
Association football forwards
Club Atlético River Plate footballers
Expatriate footballers in Argentina
Málaga CF players
RCD Mallorca players
Real Madrid CF players
Sevilla FC players
Spain B international footballers
Spanish expatriate footballers
Spanish footballers